The Reynolds Homestead, also known as Rock Spring Plantation, is a slave plantation turned historical site on Homestead Lane in Critz, Virginia.  First developed in 1814 by slaveowner Abram Reynolds, it was the primary home of R. J. Reynolds (1850-1918), founder of the R. J. Reynolds Tobacco Company, and the first major marketer of the cigarette.  Upon liberation of the plantation in 1863, 88 people were freed from captivity and enslavement. It was later designated a National Historic Landmark in 1977.  The homestead is currently an outreach facility of Virginia Tech, serving as a regional cultural center.  The house is open for tours.

Description and history
The Reynolds Homestead is located in a rural area of eastern Patrick County, Virginia, about one mile north of the village of Critz.  The estate house is a two-story brick building with a hip roof, from which an older two-story ell extends.  Outbuildings of the plantation complex include a large corn crib, a brick kitchen, milkhouse, and icehouse. The Reynolds family cemetery is located near the house and across a field is the slave cemetery.  The house has been restored to its nineteenth century state and includes many of the original family furnishings.

The property was first developed by Abram Reynolds, who built a log cabin near where the main house stands.  His son, Hardin W. Reynolds, developed the estate in the mid-19th century, and it here that his son, R. J. Reynolds was born and lived for the first 24 years of his life.  Reynolds achieved early economic success selling plug tobacco, but made an instant success out of the introduction of the Camel cigarette brand, which he marketed and advertised widely.

Reynolds moved out of the family homestead in 1874. It remained within the family, but in declining condition, into the mid-20th century. The property is now managed by Virginia Tech, and includes a continuing education center managed by its Department of Outreach and International Affairs. It hosts educational and cultural events, and the house is open for tours for both individuals and groups.

See also
National Register of Historic Places listings in Patrick County, Virginia
List of National Historic Landmarks in Virginia

References

External links

Reynolds Homestead official site
Reynolds Homestead, Patrick County

Virginia Tech
Houses on the National Register of Historic Places in Virginia
National Historic Landmarks in Virginia
Museums in Patrick County, Virginia
Historic house museums in Virginia
Houses completed in 1850
Reynolds, RJ
Greek Revival houses in Virginia
Reynolds family residences
National Register of Historic Places in Patrick County, Virginia
Houses in Patrick County, Virginia
Plantations in Virginia
Burial grounds of the African diaspora in the Western hemisphere